Haircut refers to the styling of hair. 

Haircut may also refer to:

 Haircut (finance), difference between loan amount and collateral value
 The Haircut, a 1982 film directed by Tamar Simon Hoffs
 Haircut (film), a 1995 film directed by Joaquim Sapinho
 Haircut (album), a 1993 album by George Thorogood
 Haircut (short story), a short story by Ring Lardner